Events from the year 1955 in France.

Incumbents
President: Rene Coty 
President of the Council of Ministers: 
 until 17 February: Pierre Mendès France
 17 February-23 February: Christian Pineau 
 starting 23 February: Edgar Faure

Events
28 March – SNCF sets a new world rail speed record of 331 km/h using electric traction.
5 May – Bonn–Paris conventions come into force, putting an end to the Allied occupation of West Germany.
11 June – 1955 Le Mans disaster. Driver Pierre Levegh and 82 spectators killed in a crash during the 1955 24 Hours of Le Mans race.
28 July – The first Interlingua congress in Tours, France, leads to the founding of the Union Mundial pro Interlingua.
6 October – The Citroen DS, a large saloon car, is launched at the Paris Motor Show.

Arts and literature
25 June – Notre Dame du Haut in Ronchamp, designed by Le Corbusier, is dedicated.
15 September – Vladimir Nabokov's Lolita is published in Paris by Olympia Press.

Sport
7 July – Tour de France begins.
30 July – Tour de France ends, won by Louison Bobet.

Births
28 January
Nicolas Sarkozy, President of France
Chantal Sébire, teacher and euthanasia campaigner (died 2008)
24 February – Alain Prost, motor racing driver
4 March – Dominique Pinon, actor
9 March – Jean-Luc Arribart, soccer player
17 March – Élie Baup, soccer player and manager
21 June – Michel Platini, soccer player
27 June – Isabelle Adjani, actress
2 August – Anne Lacaton, architect
7 August – Chantal Réga, athlete
8 September – Olivia Dutron, actress
17 September – Olivier Chandon de Brailles, motor racing driver (died 1983)
7 October – Yo-Yo Ma, cellist
14 December – Hervé Guibert, writer (died 1991)

Deaths
15 January – Yves Tanguy, surrealist painter (born 1900)
23 February – Paul Claudel, poet, dramatist and diplomat (born 1868)
22 March – Maurice Schutz, actor (born 1866)
19 June – Adrienne Monnier, poet and publisher (born 1892)
5 November – Maurice Utrillo, painter (born 1883)
27 November – Arthur Honegger, composer (born 1892)

See also
 List of French films of 1955
 1955 in French television

References

1950s in France